Guillaume Rocheron is a French visual effects supervisor who was born in 1981 in Paris. He began his career in 2000 at the Paris-based BUF Compagnie, and after five years there he got invited to work for the Moving Picture Company.  He won the Academy Award during the 85th Academy Awards for the film Life of Pi in the category of Best Visual Effects. He shared his win with Donald R. Elliott, Erik-Jan de Boer and Bill Westenhofer. In 2020, he received his second Academy Award nomination for Best Visual Effects, and second win, for the 2019 film, 1917, at the 92nd Academy Awards.

Selected filmography

 Panic Room (2002)
 The Matrix Reloaded (2003)
 Batman Begins (2005)
 Harry Potter and the Goblet of Fire (2005)
 X-Men: The Last Stand (2006)
 10,000 BC (2008)
 The Chronicles of Narnia: Prince Caspian (2008)
 G.I. Joe: The Rise of Cobra (2009)
 Harry Potter and the Half-Blood Prince (2009)
 Night at the Museum: Battle of the Smithsonian (2009)
 Percy Jackson & the Olympians: The Lightning Thief (2010)
 Fast Five (2011)
 Sucker Punch (2011)
 Life of Pi (2012)
 Man of Steel (2013)
 The Secret Life of Walter Mitty (2013)
 Godzilla (2014)
 Into the Storm (2014)
 Batman v Superman: Dawn of Justice (2016)
 Ghost in the Shell (2017)
 Godzilla: King of the Monsters (2019)
 Ad Astra (2019)
 1917 (2019)
 Nope (2022)
 Bardo (2022)

References

External links

1981 births
Living people
Best Visual Effects Academy Award winners
Best Visual Effects BAFTA Award winners
Special effects people
Visual effects supervisors
Film people from Paris
French expatriates in Canada
French animators